Pollo motuleño is a dish that originated in the town of Motul, Yucatán. For this dish, chicken is cooked with orange juice, achiote and plantains.

See also
 List of Mexican dishes

References

Mexican chicken dishes